Yllenus desertus is a jumping spider species in the genus Yllenus that lives in Mongolia. The female was first described by Wanda Wesołowska in 1991.

References

Salticidae
Arthropods of Mongolia
Spiders of Asia
Spiders described in 1991
Taxa named by Wanda Wesołowska